is a railway station in Tsubame, Niigata, Japan, operated by East Japan Railway Company (JR East).

Lines

Station layout

The station consists of one side platform and two island platforms serving five tracks. The platforms ate connected by a footbridge. The station has a Midori no Madoguchi  staffed ticket office. The station has toilets and a concessions store.

Platforms

History
The station opened on 25 August 1912. Then station was renamed  on 20 April 1913, but reverted to its original name on 1 October 1959. With the privatization of Japanese National Railways (JNR) on 1 April 1987, the station came under the control of JR East.

Passenger statistics
In fiscal 2017, the station was used by an average of 1514 passengers daily (boarding passengers only). The passenger figures for previous years are as shown below.

Surrounding area

 
 National Route 116

See also
 List of railway stations in Japan

References

External links

  

Railway stations in Niigata Prefecture
Stations of East Japan Railway Company
Railway stations in Japan opened in 1912
Yahiko Line
Echigo Line
Tsubame, Niigata